Skåne Southern is one of the multi-member constituencies of the Riksdag, the national legislature of Sweden. As of the 2018 Swedish general election, Skåne Southern elected 14 of the 349 members of the Riksdag.

Skåne Southern contains 11 municipalities: Kävlinge, Burlöv, Staffanstorp, Lomma, Vellinge, Trelleborg, Svedala, Lund, Skurup, Sjöbo, and Ystad.

Skåne Southern is one of the four constituencies in Skåne County, along with Skåne Northern and Eastern, Skåne Western and Malmö Municipality.

Results

2018

References

Riksdag constituencies
Skåne County